This is a list of heads of state and governments deposed by a foreign power. The list is chronological.

List

References 

Changes in political power
Lists of military operations
Heads of government